Legionella quinlivanii is a Gram-negative bacterium from the genus Legionella which was isolated from a cooling tower pond in London in United Kingdom.

References

External links
Type strain of Legionella quinlivanii at BacDive -  the Bacterial Diversity Metadatabase

Legionellales
Bacteria described in 1990